Brandon Brooks (born April 29, 1981), who played water polo as a goalie for UCLA and the 2004 and 2008 United States National teams, was the head coach of the women's water polo team at UCLA until 2017. The women's team won the 2008 and 2009 NCAA Women's Water Polo Championship, and one of his players, Courtney Mathewson, captured the Peter J. Cutino Award as the player-of-the year in 2008.

On June 3, 2009, Brooks was named the head coach of the UCLA Bruins women's water polo team, having served as its men's and women's water polo team assistant coach. He was also named as an assistant coach to the USA water polo women's senior national team for the 2009 FINA World Championships.

Early years
Brooks is the oldest in his family of three children. He has twin sisters. He was born in Rock Island, Illinois, but was educated in Honolulu, Hawaii, and attended Punahou School. At Punahou, he played both basketball and water polo.

College

He was the goalkeeper at UCLA for four years and was a four-time All-America selection (1999 hm, 2000, 2001 and 2002). He helped UCLA to NCAA Men's Water Polo Championships in 1999 and 2000, and became the school's all-time leader with 700 saves. He was also a three-time All-MPSF honoree (2000, 2001 and 2002).

Brooks was a walked-on to UCLA basketball team his freshman year. He graduated from UCLA in 2005 with a degree in sociology.

Olympic Games
In the summer 2004 Olympic Games, Brooks, Adam Wright and Brett Ormsby, two former UCLA teammates, completed for Team USA in Athens Greece. He was a member of 2008 Water Polo Team USA. In the gold medal championship match, Brooks had four saves and helped the USA team to win the silver medal, losing to Hungary 14-10. He was a big cheerleader on the bench for the United States team.

Coaching
During his three years as the head women's water polo coach at UCLA, Brooks' team has won two MPSF Tournament championships. In the 2012 tournament title game, the team defeated Stanford 8-7 in overtime, and he was rewarded with the Mountain Pacific Sports Federation (MPSF) Coach of the Year honor.

See also
 List of Olympic medalists in water polo (men)
 List of men's Olympic water polo tournament goalkeepers

References

External links
 

1981 births
Living people
American male water polo players
Water polo goalkeepers
Water polo players at the 2004 Summer Olympics
Water polo players at the 2008 Summer Olympics
Medalists at the 2008 Summer Olympics
Olympic silver medalists for the United States in water polo
UCLA Bruins men's water polo players
American water polo coaches
National team coaches
Punahou School alumni